Dennis Avery may refer to:

Dennis Avery (politician) (born 1946), Indiana politician
Dennis T. Avery (born 1936), director of the Center for Global Food Issues at the Hudson Institute